Ryan Lau Hok Ming (born 19 October 1995 in Hong Kong) is a Hong Kong professional footballer who currently plays as a centre back for Hong Kong Premier League club Southern.

Club career
Lau has been sent to Premier League football club Aston Villa and La Liga football club Barcelona for training.

Metro Gallery
On 26 November 2014, Lau scored his first goal of his football career for Metro Gallery against Yuen Long, which the match loses 1:2. On 27 September 2015, Lau scored his first goal of Dreams Metro Gallery against Yuen Long, which the match wins 3:2.

Southern
In June 2016, Lau signed for Southern. He made 50 appearances for the club and was a part of the club's 2018-19 Hong Kong FA Cup runners-up side. 

On 31 May 2019, Southern announced that Lau would depart the club after three seasons.

Eastern
On 1 June 2019, it was reported that Lau had signed with Eastern. This was confirmed on 17 July 2019 during the club's season opening media event.

Lee Man
On 1 September 2019, Lau was loaned to Lee Man for a year.

Pegasus
On 15 October 2020, Eastern head coach Lee Chi Kin revealed that Lau had been loaned to Pegasus.

Rangers
On 31 August 2021, Lau was loaned to Rangers.

Return to Southern
On 23 July 2022, Lau signed a contract to return to Southern after three seasons.

International career
On 1 June 2022, Lau made his international debut for Hong Kong in the friendly match against Malaysia.

Career statistics

International

Family
Lau Hok Ming's brother Lau Ka Ming is a former professional football player.

References

External links
 
 Lau Hok Ming at HKFA
 

1995 births
Living people
Hong Kong footballers
Hong Kong international footballers
Hong Kong Premier League players
Metro Gallery FC players
Southern District FC players
Eastern Sports Club footballers
Lee Man FC players
TSW Pegasus FC players
Hong Kong Rangers FC players
Association football defenders
Footballers at the 2018 Asian Games
Asian Games competitors for Hong Kong